William J.J. Chase was an American architect of Atlanta, Georgia.

He designed many schools, hospitals, and jails and at least seven courthouses around the state. A number of his works are listed on the National Register of Historic Places (NRHP).

Works include:
Seminole County Courthouse (1922), Courthouse Sq., Donalsonville, GA, NRHP-listed  Beaux Arts-style courthouse built in 1922, with an Ionic tetrastyle projecting entrance.
Moultrie High School (1928–29), 7th Ave., Moultrie, GA, NRHP-listed
Mitchell County Courthouse (mid-1930s), in the NRHP-listed Camilla Commercial Historic District, Camilla, GA, NRHP-listed
Dixie Hunt Hotel (1937), 209 Spring St., SW, Gainesville, GA, NRHP-listed
Troup County Courthouse, Annex, and Jail (1939), LaGrange, Georgia. Public Works Administration-funded, Stripped Classical style.
Cook County Courthouse (1939), 212 N. Hutchinson Ave., Adel, GA, NRHP-listed
Carroll County Courthouse, Newnan and Dixie Sts. Carrollton, GA, NRHP-listed
Hall County Jail, Bradford St., Gainesville, GA, NRHP-listed 
One or more works in Reynoldstown Historic District, roughly bounded by the CSX rail line, Memorial Dr., Pearl St., and Moreland, Atlanta, GA, NRHP-listed
One or more works in Downtown Douglas Historic District, roughly bounded by Jackson St., Pearl Ave., Cherry St. and the Georgia-Florida RR tracks, Douglas, GA, NRHP-listed
One or more works in Fort Valley State College Historic District, Pear St. and State University Dr., Fort Valley, GA, NRHP-listed

References

Architects from Atlanta
Year of birth missing
Year of death missing